Sílvio Silas da Silva Walenga (born 11 October 1988), simply known as Sílvio, is a Brazilian footballer who plays for Cianorte as a goalkeeper.

Club career
Born in Ponta Grossa, Mato Grosso do Sul, Sílvio graduated with Cianorte's youth system, making his senior debuts in 2006 and becoming a starter in 2008. On 12 June 2009 he signed for Internacional, but was only used in the club's B-team.

On 26 January 2011, after having a two-week trial at Chelsea, Sílvio joined Atlético Paranaense. After being released he moved to América-RN, but was only used as a backup.

On 12 February 2012 Sílvio returned to Paraná, signing a short-term deal with Operário Ferroviário. After impressing with the side in Campeonato Paranaense he joined Coritiba on 5 June of the following year, being immediately loaned to Marcílio Dias.

On 19 July 2013 Sílvio moved back to his former club América, making his professional debut on 10 September, starting in a 1–1 away draw against Icasa for the Série B championship. However, he was mainly used as a backup to Andrey, only appearing in three matches.

On 10 January 2014 Sílvio joined Chapecoense, newly promoted to Série A. He subsequently spent the whole campaign as a third-choice, behind Nivaldo and Danilo.

Honours 
Confiança
 Campeonato Sergipano: 2017

References

External links

1988 births
Living people
Sportspeople from Mato Grosso do Sul
Brazilian footballers
Association football goalkeepers
Campeonato Brasileiro Série B players
Campeonato Brasileiro Série D players
Sport Club Internacional players
Club Athletico Paranaense players
América Futebol Clube (RN) players
Operário Ferroviário Esporte Clube players
Coritiba Foot Ball Club players
Clube Náutico Marcílio Dias players
Associação Chapecoense de Futebol players
Associação Desportiva Confiança players